Picrophilus oshimae is a species of Archaea described in 1996. Picrophilus oshimae was found in a fumarole in Hokkaido, Japan. The hot spring the fumarole was located in had a pH of 2.2.

See also
 Picrophilus torridus

References

Further reading

External links
Type strain of Picrophilus oshimae at BacDive -  the Bacterial Diversity Metadatabase

Archaea described in 1996
Euryarchaeota